"Oh, salvaje" (English: O, Savage) is a song recorded by Spanish singer-songwriter Zahara for her fourth studio album, Santa (2015). The song was first released as a promotional single in March 2015. "Oh, salvaje" was written and produced by Zahara and Sergio Sastre.

The single has received national acclaim from music critics who encouraged its sound as a great pop ballad which is fresh and different to what the singer usually composes.

Antecedents 

The single was first heard during the November 2014 tour called la gira el Deshielo.

References 

2015 singles
Spanish pop songs